Duddingston is a historic village in the east of Edinburgh, Scotland, next to Holyrood Park.

Origins and etymology
The estate wherein Duddingston Village now lies was first recorded in lands granted to the Tironensian monks of Kelso Abbey by David I of Scotland between 1136 and 1147, and is described as stretching from the Crag (from Craggenmarf, an old name for Arthur's Seat) to the Magdalene Bridge. Herbert, the first Abbot at Kelso granted the lands of Easter and Wester Duddingston to Reginald de Bosco for an annual rent of 10 merks.

This land grant included the settlement known by the name of Treverlen or Traverlin, in the western part of it; this being the oldest known name of the village and estates that eventually became known as Duddingston.  There are several possibilities for the etymology of "Treverlen":

 "tref + gwr + lên" meaning "place of the learned man"
 "tref + y + glyn" with lenition following the definite article, meaning "place of the learned women"
 "tre + war + lyn" meaning "the farm at or on the loch"
 "traefor llyn" meaning "settlement by the lake (loch) of reeds and/or rushes"

All these names originate in the Celtic Brythonic languages, which pre-date the use of the Gaelic or Saxon tongues in Scotland, suggesting that they may go back to the time of some of the earliest settlements on Arthur's Seat. The last two names, in particular, fit well as a possible name for the Celtic crannog settlement which stood in the southernmost corner of Duddingston Loch.

The last Celtic owner of the Treverlen estates is said to have been Uviet the White who owned it from at least 1090 onwards. By 1128, though, at the founding of Holyrood Abbey, the lands of Arthur's Seat seem to have become divided between the Royal Demesne and the estates of Treverlen belonging to Uviet the White. For confirmation of what passed in 1128 at the forming of Holyrood Abbey and the passing of the lands to Kelso Abbey, we can look to the later "Charter of Confirmation, Granted to the Monks of Kelso of King Malcolm IV". Malcolm IV of Scotland inherited the throne from his grandfather David I of Scotland, and was perhaps called upon to confirm many such gifts of land in case of later disputes. This he did, in the above-mentioned charter, confirming the previously given entitlement of

Traverlin, with its due bounds, as Vineth fully and freely possessed and enjoyed it, with all the easements of the adjoining strother (march), which is called Cameri; and the Crag of the same village

to Kelso Abbey. Malcolm goes on to state that in his grandfather's time Alfwyn (perhaps the saxonised form of Uviet, or one of his descendants), Abbot of Halyrude (Holyrood Abbey) and Ernald, Abbot of Kelso, came to an agreement concerning a dispute between them over The Crag, which allowed for the lands of The Crag and Traverlin to pass to the church of Kelso, in exchange for the ten-pounds-lands they had in "Hardiggasthorn, near Northamtun".

The name was superseded during the thirteenth and fourteenth centuries by "Dodinestun" from "Dodin’s Estate". This name change came about just after the lands and estates were given to Kelso Abbey by David I. The Abbey quickly feued the estate to one Dodin de Berwic, evidently, from his name, an Anglo-Norman knight. Apparently, then, it was Dodin who changed the name of the settlement, as by 1150 he was referring to himself as "Dodin of Dodinestoun". (Dodin's toun or farm place). This last may be slightly misleading, though, as there was a toft (a homestead with attached arable land) near Berwick-Upon-Tweed, also referred to as Dodin's Town, with which he is quite likely to have had connections. However, it seems likely that the names are connected through branches of the same Norman family. Thereafter the village is often, though not always, referred to as Duddingston, with quite a wide range of spellings. For instance, from heraldic sources we are told that in May 1290 Edward I granted a protection against proceedings for debts to William de Dodingstone, burgess of Edinburgh. Also, with quite a different spelling, but six years later, we are told the name is that of a locality near Edinburgh, and Eleyne de Duddynggeston, of that county, swore fealty to Edward I.

The kirk which was built on the newly gifted lands went by the name Duddingston Kirk, but the name Treverlen still survived into the next century as the parish name, being confirmed as such in a list of 13 parishes belonging to Kelso in 1200, which leads one to suspect there had been a kirk on the site previously.  The name has now been given to the new park built on the site of the former Portobello High School and St John's Primary School.

History

Cassells says the village was a centre of weaving in the 18th century where "over 40 looms" were in production on The Loan, creating a coarse linen called "Duddingston hardings".

Duddingston Loch has been used for ice-skating and curling, even boasting a curling house, for several centuries. In the 17th and 18th century the village was primarily a centre for the coal and salt mining industry, but was also known for its weaving industry, in particular for a cloth known as Duddingston Hardings.

Bonnie Prince Charlie held a council of war in a house ("then thatched now tiled") in the village, shortly before the Battle of Prestonpans in 1745. In the same year, James Hamilton, 8th Earl of Abercorn purchased the Duddingston Estate from the Duke of Argyll. Lord Abercorn commissioned the architect Sir William Chambers to design Duddingston House in the Palladian style, and this was completed by 1768.

The loch provided the setting for Henry Raeburn's painting of The Skating Minister, painted in the 1790s, as well as the less famous but very atmospheric painting by Charles Lees called Skaters on Duddingston Loch by Moonlight.

Dr. James Tytler (1745–1804), author, balloonist and encyclopedist, lived in Duddingston. Robert Burns knew him, describing him as a mortal who wandered the precincts of Edinburgh in leaky shoes, a sky-lighted hat and unlikely breeches, who yet was responsible for at least three quarters of Elliot's Encyclopædia Britannica. In 1774 he was living on the Holyrood Abbey "sanctuary lands" to avoid his creditors. After his wife left him and their children in 1775, he was known thereafter to be co-habiting with at least one, if not two women, one of them a Duddingston washerwoman. This circumstance eventually led to his flight from Scottish justice for the crime of bigamy in 1788, when he left Duddingston, and both women, to remove himself to Berwick. Whilst living in Duddingston he did build a printing press, and turned out further copies of the encyclopedia, and other more successful publications, but he was a poor businessman and never seemed to benefit from these and other successes. Sadly, even his attempt at ballooning in 1784 was something of a debacle.

The former Home House in Old Church Lane was built in 1820 and is a category B Listed building  that was formerly a children's home for Church of Scotland missionary children.

Ethnicity

Local attractions

The Sheep Heid Inn, usually referred to as the "Sheep's Heid", is said to be Scotland's oldest pub, dating from 1360. It is named after a snuff box either embellished with, or in the shape of a ram's head presented to the landlord by King James VI in 1580.

Since 1923, the loch has been a wildlife reserve, managed by the Scottish Wildlife Trust. It contains a variety of wildfowl and reedbeds. The loch is part of Holyrood Park which is 'owned' by the Scottish Ministers. The Scottish Wildlife Trust purchased the adjacent land at Bawsinch in 1971 and expanded the bird sanctuary into this area.

Dr Neil's Garden is located between Duddingston Kirk and the Loch. Andrew and Nancy Neil were awarded the Queen Elizabeth, the Queen Mother Medal by the Royal Caledonian Horticultural Society.

Sources 
 Susan Mercer: Take One Garden (2006).
 The Miller O' Duddingston or The Betrothal by J. F. Published in 1875. The author, John Forbes, lived in Duddingston when he wrote it. In his handwritten notes in the National Library of Scotland Archive copy of this book, he says it was written after an accident left him an invalid for a period of seven weeks, and he decided to take some of the tales he had heard from a good friend and storyteller who had been a drayman in the area, and mix fact and fiction into a story set locally. The result is a rollicking good tale, written in verse, of about 40 pages. In the handwritten end notes, the author mentions that one of the characters was based on a real person, and relates the story of a famous suicide which happened at that time. All the locations are real, however, including the Sheep Heid Inn, which one can still visit in the present day, and which has a treasure trove of stories and memorabilia for you to peruse while you enjoy your food and drinks.
 The Cobbler by Alexander Whitelaw. Published in 1833 This is a short story first published in 1833 as part of a collection of works by the best writers of the day called "The Republic of Letters".  It was edited by Alexander Whitelaw, and included a few of his own pieces of work. "The Cobbler" is a salutary comedy about knowing who your friends are. The action takes place in various locations in the village, most of them gone now, except for the Sheep Heid Inn. In the frontispiece of this collection, and alongside later versions,  of the story in other collections are sketches and woodcuts of Robin Rentoul the "Duddingston Cobbler".  The original of one of these drawings  is in The Sheep Heid Inn upstairs dining room.
 Tales of Thomas Neil Thomas Neil, an undertaker in Don's Close, was born in 1730 and died in 1800.  Also known as Tom or Tam Neil, during the last forty years of his life he was precentor of the Old Tolbooth Church.  Burns, in a letter referring to a version of "Up and warn a' Willie" he received from Neil, refers to him as "of facetious fame", but adds "Tam kenn'd what was what fu' brawlie".  In the footnotes written by the collector of those Burns letters, R. H. Cromek, says "he (Tom Neil) had a good strong voice, and was greatly distinguished by his powers of mimicry; as well his humorous manner of singing old Scottish ballads".  The most notable character Tam Neil was famous for was one he invented, and then portrayed frequently upon request, with great humour, that he called "The Auld Wife".  Mary Clementina Hibbert-Ware calls him "that son of song, possessed of greater local notoriety in his time than any other man in Edinburgh".  His notoriety was certainly more than just "local" if the descriptions of Tam Neil found in books from all over Scotland are to be believed.  The Transactions of the Hawick Archaeological Society gives a particularly long description of Tam, describing him as "formed for the very purpose of smoothing the wrinkled brow of care".  One story about Tam Neil occurs at Duddingston, in the village alehouse.  Presumably this refers to the Sheep Heid Inn, as the reference seems to suggest there is only one alehouse in Duddingston.  In M. C. Hibbert-Ware's version the location of the inn is certainly given in detail, and is assuredly The Sheep Heid Inn.  The story itself involves the irate landlady of the public house, a coffin, and a rascal that cannot pass an alehouse without stopping for a drink even if he has no money and should be working.  Like all rascals, though, he nevertheless gets away with it!  Other stories about Tam Neil can be found in many books of the day.

References

External links
 Bartholomew's Chronological map of Edinburgh (1919)
 Gazetteer for Scotland: Duddingston
 Sheep Heid Inn, Duddingston
 Dr Neils Garden Trust, Duddingston

Areas of Edinburgh
Parishes formerly in Midlothian